Sergei Boikov (born January 24, 1996) is a Russian professional ice hockey defenceman currently playing for the HC Dynamo Moscow of the Kontinental Hockey League (KHL). He was drafted in the 6th round, 161st overall, by the Colorado Avalanche in the 2015 NHL Entry Draft.

Playing career
Boikov played junior hockey in his homeland, with Kuznetskie Medvedi of the MHL in the 2012–13 season. He was selected by Metallurg Novokuznetsk in the third round, 88th overall, in the 2013 KHL Junior Draft.

With aspirations to pursue and NHL career, Boikov came over to North America after he was picked No. 90 overall by the Drummondville Voltigeurs in the second round of the 2013 CHL Import Draft. He spent three seasons playing with the Voltigeurs of the Quebec Major Junior Hockey League. After a first-round exit in the post-season of the 2015–16 season, Boikov ended his junior career in initially signing an amateur try-out contract with the Avalanche's AHL affiliate, the San Antonio Rampage, on April 6, 2016. He appeared in four regular season games with the Rampage to conclude his season.

Despite his KHL rights traded by Novokuznetsk to Salavat Yulaev Ufa, Boikov opted to continue in North America after securing a three-year, entry-level contract with the Colorado Avalanche on May 27, 2016.  After attending the 2016 Avalanche training camp, he was reassigned back to the Rampage to begin his first full professional season in 2016–17. On November 3, 2016, he was assigned to ECHL affiliate, the Colorado Eagles, scoring his first professional goal in 7 games before returning to San Antonio on November 22, 2016. Boikov solidified his role on the blueline through the progression of the season and as the Rampage missed the post-season, finished with 16 points in 63 games. He was reassigned to the Eagles for their playoff run, contributing with 10 points in 18 games to help the club to their first Kelly Cup.

At the conclusion of his entry-level contract, Boikov was tendered a qualifying offer for his NHL rights to remain with the Avalanche. Unable to work his way into the NHL, Boikov opted to return to Russia in securing a two-year contract with HC Dynamo Moscow of the KHL on July 15, 2019.

After a transitional first season adapting back to the larger ice, Boikov saw an increased role in the following 2020–21 season, establishing a career high in 38 appearances from the blueline, and posting four assists. On 16 April 2021, Boikov was signed to a two-year contract extension to remain with Dynamo Moscow

International play

Boikov first made his international debut for Russia at the junior level in the 2013 Ivan Hlinka Memorial Tournament. In the midst of his final junior season in the QMJHL, Boikov returned to the junior set-up in featuring in the 2016 World Junior Championships, taking home a silver medal in the tournament after the teams overtime loss in the Championship game to host's Finland.

Career statistics

Regular season and playoffs

International

Awards and honours

References

External links

1996 births
Living people
Colorado Avalanche draft picks
Colorado Eagles players
Drummondville Voltigeurs players
HC Dynamo Moscow players
Kuznetskie Medvedi players
Russian ice hockey defencemen
San Antonio Rampage players
Utah Grizzlies (ECHL) players